Krzysztof Martens is a Polish bridge player and author of multiple bridge books.

Bridge accomplishments

Awards

 Mott-Smith Trophy (1) 2008
 EBL Hall of Fame (1) 2018

Wins

 World Transnational Open Teams Championship (2) 1997, 2015 
 World Olympiad Teams Championship (1) 1984
 European Open Team Championships (3) 1981, 1989, 1993
 European Champions' Cup (1) 2016
 European Winter Games (1) 2016
 North American Bridge Championships (1)
 Vanderbilt (1) 2008

Runners-up

 Bermuda Bowl (1) 1991 
 Cavendish Invitational Pairs (1) 2013
 European Open Pairs (1) 2009
 North American Bridge Championships (4)
 Jacoby Open Swiss Teams (1) 1999 
 Keohane North American Swiss Teams (1) 2010 
 Spingold Knockout Teams (2) 2016, 2019

References

External links
 
 

Polish contract bridge players
Bermuda Bowl players
Living people
Place of birth missing (living people)
Year of birth missing (living people)